Moldova does not recognize same-sex marriage or civil unions. The Constitution of Moldova defines marriage as being between "a husband and a wife".

Registered partnerships

Registered partnerships are not recognized in Moldova. If established, such a scheme would likely offer same-sex couples some of the rights, benefits and responsibilities of marriage. Moldova is obliged under the European Court of Human Rights' ruling in Fedotova and Others v. Russia, and potentially its earlier ruling in Oliari and Others v. Italy, to provide legal recognition to same-sex couples.

Same-sex marriage
Article 48(2) of the Constitution of Moldova states that "[t]he family shall be founded on a freely consented marriage between a husband and wife, on their full equality in rights and the parents' right and obligation to ensure their children's upbringing, education and training." In addition, Article 48(1) states: "The family shall represent the natural and fundamental factor of the society, and shall enjoy the State and society protection." The wording has been interpreted as banning same-sex marriage, though the Constitutional Court of Moldova has not ruled on a case challenging this definition. The Family Code refers to married spouses as "man and woman". Article 2 of the code states that "family relations are performed according to the principles of [...] voluntariness of the marriage union of the man and woman [...]".

Transgender persons are permitted to marry a person of the opposite sex after sex reassignment surgery and the changing of their identification documents to reflect their legal gender.

Public opinion
Opinion polls report that a majority of Moldovans oppose the legal recognition of same-sex marriage. A 2014 survey from the Institute for Public Policy (IPP) showed that 6% of Moldovans supported same-sex marriage, while 87% were opposed. The same survey also showed that only 6% of Moldovans knew a gay person.

A 2017 Pew Research Center poll found that 5% of Moldovans supported same-sex marriage, the lowest in Eastern Europe alongside Russia. Support is increasing, with a 2022 poll commissioned by GENDERDOC-M showing that 14% of Chișinău residents supported same-sex marriage. The poll also showed that residents who had a negative attitude towards LGBT people decreased from 55% to 33% in the space of three years. LGBT advocate Angelica Frolov said, in response to the survey, "Already in 2022 we have some changes at the level of legislation. Finally, the law providing for punishments for hate crimes and hate speech was passed. It is a step forward because the LGBT community will also be protected and is expressly mentioned in the law among the protected criteria. There are a lot of positive developments in the country. Obviously they are because the homophobic party, the Party of Socialists, has left, which was doing everything it could to prevent equal rights for some groups. There came a pro-European party that believes that the people should not be divided, that all people, equally, must enjoy their rights.", referencing the 2020 election in which Maia Sandu of the Party of Action and Solidarity defeated Igor Dodon of the Party of Socialists, known for its social conservatism.

See also
LGBT rights in Moldova
Recognition of same-sex unions in Europe

Notes

References

LGBT rights in Moldova
Moldova